Li Huohui (born October 1963) is a lieutenant general in the People's Liberation Army of China.

He is a representative of the 19th National Congress of the Chinese Communist Party and a member of the 19th Central Committee of the Chinese Communist Party. He is a delegate to the 13th National People's Congress.

Biography
He served in the Nanjing Military Region and Fujian Military District for a long time. In January 2011, he rose to become chief of staff of the 12th Group Army, a position he held until 2015, when he was commissioned as commander of the 31st Group Army. He became head of the Training and Administration Department of the Central Military Commission in January 2017, and served until December 2021, while he was made deputy commander of the People's Liberation Army Ground Force. 

He was promoted to the rank of major general (shaojiang) in 2012 and lieutenant general (zhongjiang) in 2018.

References

1963 births
Living people
People from Fengcheng, Jiangxi
PLA National Defence University alumni
People's Liberation Army generals from Jiangxi
Delegates to the 13th National People's Congress
Members of the 19th Central Committee of the Chinese Communist Party